Lake Holbrook may refer to:

Lake Holbrook (Texas)
Lake Holbrook (Massachusetts)
Holbrook Lake (Michigan)
Holbrook Lake (Minnesota)